Newbury is an incorporated village in the Canadian province of Ontario, located in Middlesex County. As of the 2016 census, its population is 466. It is located in the southwestern corner of the county, entirely surrounded by the municipality of Southwest Middlesex. The Four Counties Health Services Hospital is based in Newbury and is part of the Middlesex Hospital Alliance. The hospital serves approximately 23,000 residents, primarily from the Village of Newbury, Lambton, Kent, Middlesex and Elgin Counties.

History
The village got its start in 1851 when the Great Western Railway was built through the area. The first house built was located south of the railroad in 1851 by Robert Thompson. The settlement was originally known as Ward's Station, but was renamed in 1854 after the namesake town in England since most of the residents were of English and Irish origin. That same year, the post office opened with Robert Thompson as first postmaster.

By 1872, Newbury's population had reached 750 people. The following year it was incorporated as a village. During those early years, Newbury had a flourmill, seven hotels, three churches, a school, library, fire hall, and a basket factory. In January 1873, Newbury’s first council was elected.

In 1967, the Four Counties General Hospital opened, followed by the Newbury Medical Clinic in 1972.

Demographics

References

External links

Villages in Ontario
Lower-tier municipalities in Ontario
Municipalities in Middlesex County, Ontario